William C. "Wild Bill" Kelly (June 24, 1905 – November 14, 1931) was a professional American football player.  He was born in Denver, Colorado, but grew up in Missoula, Montana.

High school career
Kelly's legend started when he led Missoula High School to the school's first state championship in 1921.  The win made Kelly a local hero, and he was recruited to play for the hometown college, the University of Montana.

College career
It didn't take long for him to make his mark at the college level—as a sophomore, he ran 9 times for scores of longer than 40 yards.  He played quarterback, but he was most noted for his skills as an open-field runner.  He also performed as a kick returner and during his final two seasons he ran back 5 kickoffs, including 2 of more than 90 yards.  Although his skills were legendary, he was not surrounded with enough talent at Montana to deliver a winning season during his college career.  However, he provided the fans with more than their share of excitement.  Importantly, Kelly never lost to rival Montana State University, leading the team to huge wins in 1925 and 1926.  He scored a total of 7 touchdowns in the two games to go along with 4 interceptions.

In the 1927 East-West Shrine Game, Kelly threw the only touchdown pass of the day, which provided the margin of victory in a 7–3 win by West.

Professional career
After college, Kelly went on to play for the National Football League's New York Yankees, Frankford Yellow Jackets and Brooklyn Dodgers from 1927 through 1930.

Kelly collapsed suddenly and died while watching a football game in New York at the age of 26.

Awards and recognition
The College Football Hall of Fame inducted Kelly in 1969.  In 1971, he was named as the quarterback of the East-West Shrine Game's all-time team.

References

External links
 
 Pro Football Research Association

1905 births
1931 deaths
Sportspeople from Missoula, Montana
American football quarterbacks
Montana Grizzlies football players
New York Yankees (NFL) players
Frankford Yellow Jackets players
Brooklyn Dodgers (NFL) players
College Football Hall of Fame inductees